Graeme Yeats (born 21 September 1964) is a former Australian rules footballer who played for Melbourne in the VFL/AFL.

A skilful and consistent defender/wingman, Yeats played 182 games with Melbourne, including 13 finals and the 1988 VFL Grand Final. He later played VFA/VFL football for Springvale. In the 1996 VFL Grand Final, his mark on the goal-line and subsequent goal from a tight angle with 47 seconds remaining was the winning goal in Springvale's 3-point premiership win against Frankston.

Yeats later won a VFL premiership as coach with Sandringham. He then coached the Dandenong Stingrays in the TAC Cup Under 18's Competition. He stepped down from the role at the end of the 2013 season.

Statistics

|- style="background:#EAEAEA"
| scope="row" text-align:center | 1984
| 
| 45 || 13 || 0 || 1 || 122 || 65 || 187 || 30 ||  || 0.0 || 0.1 || 9.4 || 5.0 || 14.4 || 2.3 ||  || 0
|-
| scope="row" text-align:center | 1985
| 
| 8 || 10 || 1 || 2 || 74 || 39 || 113 || 10 ||  || 0.1 || 0.2 || 7.4 || 3.9 || 11.3 || 1.0 ||  || 0
|- style="background:#EAEAEA"
| scope="row" text-align:center | 1986
| 
| 8 || 5 || 0 || 1 || 50 || 13 || 63 || 19 ||  || 0.0 || 0.2 || 10.0 || 2.6 || 12.6 || 3.8 ||  || 0
|-
| scope="row" text-align:center | 1987
| 
| 8 || 23 || 8 || 13 || 320 || 92 || 412 || 92 || 30 || 0.3 || 0.6 || 13.9 || 4.0 || 17.9 || 4.0 || 1.3 || 3
|- style="background:#EAEAEA"
| scope="row" text-align:center | 1988
| 
| 8 || 26 || 9 || 17 || 343 || 93 || 436 || 94 || 30 || 0.3 || 0.7 || 13.2 || 3.6 || 16.8 || 3.6 || 1.2 || 6
|-
| scope="row" text-align:center | 1989
| 
| 8 || 16 || 8 || 11 || 174 || 57 || 231 || 46 || 16 || 0.5 || 0.7 || 10.9 || 3.6 || 14.4 || 2.9 || 1.0 || 0
|- style="background:#EAEAEA"
| scope="row" text-align:center | 1990
| 
| 8 || 23 || 9 || 4 || 272 || 102 || 374 || 89 || 23 || 0.4 || 0.2 || 11.8 || 4.4 || 16.3 || 3.9 || 1.0 || 6
|-
| scope="row" text-align:center | 1991
| 
| 8 || 15 || 4 || 1 || 181 || 60 || 241 || 47 || 20 || 0.3 || 0.1 || 12.1 || 4.0 || 16.1 || 3.1 || 1.3 || 1
|- style="background:#EAEAEA"
| scope="row" text-align:center | 1992
| 
| 8 || 19 || 5 || 2 || 253 || 75 || 328 || 73 || 14 || 0.3 || 0.1 || 13.3 || 3.9 || 17.3 || 3.8 || 0.7 || 4
|-
| scope="row" text-align:center | 1993
| 
| 8 || 7 || 1 || 0 || 65 || 24 || 89 || 17 || 4 || 0.1 || 0.0 || 9.3 || 3.4 || 12.7 || 2.4 || 0.6 || 0
|- style="background:#EAEAEA"
| scope="row" text-align:center | 1994
| 
| 8 || 19 || 0 || 0 || 190 || 69 || 259 || 51 || 23 || 0.0 || 0.0 || 10.0 || 3.6 || 13.6 || 2.7 || 1.2 || 1
|-
| scope="row" text-align:center | 1995
| 
| 8 || 6 || 0 || 0 || 21 || 7 || 28 || 7 || 4 || 0.0 || 0.0 || 3.5 || 1.2 || 4.7 || 1.2 || 0.7 || 0
|- class="sortbottom"
! colspan=3 | Career
! 182
! 45
! 52
! 2065
! 696
! 2761
! 575
! 164
! 0.2
! 0.3
! 11.3
! 3.8
! 15.2
! 3.2
! 1.1
! 21
|}

References

External links 
 
 

1964 births
Australian rules footballers from Victoria (Australia)
Living people
Melbourne Football Club players
Prahran Football Club players
Sandringham Football Club coaches
Casey Demons players